Veliko Brdo is a village southwest of Ilirska Bistrica in the Inner Carniola region of Slovenia, close to the border with Croatia.

Mass graves
Veliko Brdo is the site of three mass graves or unmarked graves from the end of the Second World War. They all contain the remains of German soldiers from the 97th Corps that fell at the beginning of May 1945. The Church Mass Grave is located at the northeast edge of Holy Trinity Church, on the west edge of the village. It contains the remains of seventeen soldiers. The Ilovce Mass Grave is located in the Ilovce meadow at the crossroads by house no. 59 south of the village. It contains the remains of seven soldiers. The Hrbe Grave, also known as the Hrebeh Grave, is located a meadow alongside the road south of the village. It contains the remains of one soldier.

Church
The local church in the settlement is dedicated to the Holy Trinity and belongs to the Parish of Jelšane.

Notes

References

External links
Veliko Brdo on Geopedia

Populated places in the Municipality of Ilirska Bistrica